German submarine U-100 was a Type VIIB U-boat of Nazi Germany's Kriegsmarine during World War II.

Design
German Type VIIB submarines were preceded by the shorter Type VIIA submarines. U-100 had a displacement of  when at the surface and  while submerged. She had two shafts and two  propellers.

U-100 was fitted with five  torpedo tubes (four fitted at the bow and one at the stern), fourteen torpedoes, one  SK C/35 naval gun, 220 rounds, and one  anti-aircraft gun. The boat had a complement of between forty-four and sixty.

Service history

First patrol
The boat was launched on 10 April 1940, with a crew of 53, under the command of Kapitänleutnant Joachim Schepke. On her first active patrol, U-100 came into contact with two Allied convoys, OA-198 and OA-204. She shadowed both convoys.

Second patrol
U-100 departed for her second active patrol on 11 September 1940, coming into contact with the Allied convoy HX 72. HX 72 lost 11 ships in total, with U-100 accounting for 7 ships of 50,340 GRT. In the attack on this convoy, while other U-boats stood off to the side and fired their torpedoes to little or no success, U-100 penetrated inside the convoy before attacking, a tactic soon adopted by the C-in-C of U-boats, Admiral Karl Donitz.

Third patrol
After resupplying, U-100 departed for her third active patrol on 12 October 1940. She came into contact with two Allied convoys, HX 79 and SC 7.

Fourth patrol
U-100 departed on her fourth patrol on 7 November 1940. On 22 November she came into contact with the Allied convoy SC 11 and began to shadow it.

Fifth patrol
U-100 left for her fifth active patrol on 2 December 1940, sinking two vessels from Convoy OB 256, then a third solo vessel.

Sixth and final patrol
U-100 departed on her sixth and what would be her final patrol on 9 March 1941. She approached convoy HX 112 from astern in the pre-dawn hours of 17 March, but was detected at a range of 1,000 meters by the Type 286 radar aboard . U-100 was the first U-boat to be so discovered during World War II; she was rammed and sunk by Vanoc while attempting to submerge. Another destroyer, was also present. Six of the boat's 53 crew members survived, spending the remainder of the war as POWs. Schepke was not one of them.

Summary of raiding history

References

Bibliography

External links

 Canonesa, Convoy HX72 & U-100

German Type VIIB submarines
U-boats commissioned in 1940
U-boats sunk in 1941
World War II submarines of Germany
World War II shipwrecks in the Atlantic Ocean
1940 ships
Ships built in Kiel
U-boats sunk in collisions
U-boats sunk by British warships
Maritime incidents in March 1941